Heinrich Füllgrabe (26 July 1916 – 30 January 1945) was a Luftwaffe ace and recipient of the Knight's Cross of the Iron Cross during World War II. The Knight's Cross of the Iron Cross was awarded to recognise extreme battlefield bravery or successful military leadership. After joining the Luftwaffe in the late 1930s, after his training as a fighter pilot, Füllgrabe was appointed to serve as the Unteroffizier 9./JG 52 in spring 1941. Füllgrabe became a member of one of the most efficient units of the Luftwaffe, Karaya Quartet, where he flew alongside Hermann Graf (212 kills), Alfred Grislawski (133)  and Ernst Süß (68). Füllgrabe was killed on 30 January 1945 by Soviet anti-aircraft fire near Brieg in Silesia.  During his career he was credited with 67 aerial victories, all of them on the Eastern Front, including five Il-2 Sturmoviks.

Early life and career
Füllgrabe was born on 26 July 1916 in Witzenhausen in Hesse-Nassau, a province of the Kingdom of Prussia within the German Empire. Füllgrabe joined the military service of the Luftwaffe, initially serving as a mechanic with I. Gruppe (1st group) of Jagdgeschwader 234 (JG 234–234th Fighter Wing), which later became the I. Gruppe of Jagdgeschwader 26 "Schlageter" (JG 26–26th Fighter Wing). He was trained as a fighter pilot at the Jagdfliegerschule, the fighter pilot school at Stolp-Reitz. In June 1940, Füllgrabe was posted to 2. Staffel (2nd squadron) of Ergänzungs-Jagdgruppe Merseburg, a supplementary training unit based at Merseburg. In Merseburg, he befriended Hermann Graf and Alfred Grislawski, with whom he would later spend much of his combat career. In early 1941, he was posted to 9. Staffel of Jagdgeschwader 52 (JG 52—52nd Fighter Wing), a squadron of III. Gruppe.

World War II

World War II in Europe had begun on Friday 1 September 1939 when German forces invaded Poland. At the time of Füllgrabel's posting to 9. Staffel, the Gruppe was commanded by Major Gotthard Handrick. The rise of General Ion Antonescu in Romania in 1940 led to a reorganization of his country's armed forces. In this, he was supported by a military mission from Germany, the Luftwaffenmission Rumänien (Luftwaffe Mission Romania) under the command of Generalleutnant (equivalent to major general) Wilhelm Speidel. III. Gruppe of JG 52 was transferred to Bucharest in mid-October and temporarily renamed I. Gruppe of Jagdgeschwader 28 (JG 28—28th Fighter Wing) until 4 January 1941. Its primary task was to train Romanian Air Force personnel. Here, the trio of Füllgrabe, Graf and Grislawski were joined by Ernst Süß, and later by Leopold Steinbatz and Edmund Roßmann.

War against the Soviet Union
Following its brief deployment in the Balkan Campaign, III. Gruppe was back in Bucharest by mid-June. There, the unit was again subordinated to the Luftwaffenmission Rumänien and reequipped with the new, more powerful Bf 109F-4 model. On 21 June, the Gruppe was ordered to Mizil in preparation of Operation Barbarossa, the German invasion of the Soviet Union. Its primary objective was to provide fighter protection for the oil fields and refineries at Ploiești. Prior to the invasion, Handrick was replaced by Major Albert Blumensaat as commander of III. Gruppe. Blumensaat was then replaced by Hauptmann Hubertus von Bonin on 1 October. At the time, von Bonin was still in convalescence so that Hauptmann Franz Höring, the commander of 9. Staffel, was also made the acting Gruppenkommandeur (group commander).

On 22 July 1942, the Geschwaderkommodore (wing commander) of JG 52, Major Herbert Ihlefeld, was severely injured in a flight accident and had to surrender command during his convalescence. In consequence, Major Gordon Gollob, the commander of Jagdgeschwader 77 (JG 77—77th Fighter Wing), temporarily took over command of JG 52 as acting Geschwaderkommodore.  On 17 August, Gollob was ordered dispatch one Schwarm, a flight of four aircraft, of every III. Gruppe squadron to the Don-bend. The pilots selected for this mission included Füllgrabe, Graf and Süß.

Defense of the Reich
In response to political humiliation caused by de Havilland Mosquito bombing raids into Germany, Reichsmarschall Hermann Göring, the commander-in-chief of the Luftwaffe, ordered the formation of two specialized high-altitude Luftwaffe units. These units were Jagdgeschwader 25, commanded by Major Herbert Ihlefeld, and Jagdgeschwader 50, commanded by his friend Graf. Graf was permitted to choose his personnel and had his friends Füllgrabe, Grislawski and Süß transferred from III. Gruppe of JG 52.

In December 1943, he was posted to Ergänzungs-Jagdgruppe Ost (Supplemantary Fighter Group East) as fighter pilot instructor.

On 10 January 1944, the United States Army Air Forces targeted the Luther-Werke, at the time a factory of the Messerschmitt Bf 110, Messerschmitt Me 210 and Messerschmitt Me 410, in Braunschweig, and the aircraft repair works in Waggum, a district of Braunschweig. The 3rd Bombardment Division sent 169 bombers, escorted by 466 fighter aircraft. Defending against this attack, Füllgrabe shot down one of the Boeing B-17 Flying Fortress bombers.

In late 1944, Füllgrabe was transferred to the Geschwaderstab of JG 52. The request was made by Graf who had been appointed Geschwaderkommodore (wing commander) of JG 52 in September 1944. Füllgrabe was killed in action on 30 January 1945.

Summary of career

Aerial victory claims
According to Spick, Füllgrabe was credited with 65 aerial victories claimed in an unknown number combat missions, all of which claimed on the Eastern Front. The author Obermaier lists him with 67 aerial victories, all of which claimed on the Eastern Front. Mathews and Foreman, authors of Luftwaffe Aces — Biographies and Victory Claims, researched the German Federal Archives and found records for 63 aerial victory claims, all but one heavy bomber on the Eastern Front.

Victory claims were logged to a map-reference (PQ = Planquadrat), for example "PQ 95514". These sectors were then subdivided into 36 smaller units to give a location area 3 × 4 km in size.

Awards
 Aviator badge
 Front Flying Clasp of the Luftwaffe
 Iron Cross (1939) 2nd and 1st Class
 Honor Goblet of the Luftwaffe on 30 March 1942 as Feldwebel and pilot
 German Cross in Gold on 11 May 1942 as Feldwebel in the III./Jagdgeschwader 52
 Knight's Cross of the Iron Cross on 2 October 1942 as Oberfeldwebel and pilot in the 9./Jagdgeschwader 52

Notes

References

Citations

Bibliography

 
 
 
 
 
 
 
 
 
 
 
 
 
 
 
 
 
 
 
 
 
 

1916 births
1945 deaths
People from Witzenhausen
Luftwaffe pilots
German World War II flying aces
Recipients of the Gold German Cross
Recipients of the Knight's Cross of the Iron Cross
Luftwaffe personnel killed in World War II
Aviators killed by being shot down
Military personnel from Hesse